Charles Allen House is a historic home located at Christiana, New Castle County, Delaware.  It was built in the first half of the 19th century, and is a two-story, three-bay, single pile, gable-roofed dwelling.  The main block is constructed of brick, and it has a two-story, one-bay frame addition built in the late-19th / early-20th century and a one-story, flat-roofed, stuccoed rear addition.

It was listed on the National Register of Historic Places in 1983.

Following the construction of a modern development, the house's address is now on Lauren Place, off Blue Ridge Road.

References

Houses on the National Register of Historic Places in Delaware
Houses in New Castle County, Delaware
National Register of Historic Places in New Castle County, Delaware